Ali Magoudi (born 4 January 1948 in Paris) is a French psychoanalyst and writer, born of an Algerian father and a Polish mother, raised in the French language.

He was awarded the "Prix Botul" in 2005.

Bibliography 
1986: Approche psychanalytique des toxicomanes, with Caroline Ferbos, PUF
1986: François Mitterrand. Portrait total, with Pierre Jouve, Carrère
1987: Jacques Chirac. Portrait total, with Pierre Jouve, Carrère
1987: Comment choisir son psychanalyste, under the pseudonym Oreste Saint-Drôme, Éditions du Seuil, series "Point-virgule" #48
1988: Comment se débarrasser de son psychanalyste. 15 scénarios possibles, plus un, under the pseudonym Oreste Saint-Drôme, Le Seuil, "Point-virgule" #59
1988: Les Dits et les non-dits de Jean-Marie Le Pen. Enquête et psychanalyse, with Pierre Jouve, La Découverte
1989: Le Ronfleur apprivoisé. Petite encyclopédie pratique à l'usage des ronchopates et de leurs victimes, under the pseudonym Oreste Saint-Drôme, Le Seuil, 1989
1995: Comment cultiver son petit écolier, under the pseudonym Oreste Saint-Drôme, La Découverte, 1990, 2001 ; L.G.F., #13827
1992: Quand l’homme civilise le temps, La Découverte
1992: Comment se débarrasser de ses parents… sans crime, ni châtiment, under the pseudonym Oreste Saint-Drôme, La Découverte
1989: Dictionnaire inespéré de 55 termes visités par Jacques Lacan, under the pseudonym Oreste Saint-Drôme, Le Seuil
1996: La Lettre fantôme, Éditions de Minuit
2000: Comment choisir son psychanalyste, with Frédéric Pagès, under the pseudonym Oreste Saint-Drôme, La Découverte
1999: Manifeste pour une Europe souveraine, with Jérôme Monod, Éditions Odile Jacob
2004: Le Monde d’Ali. Comment fait-on une psychanalyse quand on est Polonais, chirurgien, arabe, élevé dans le Sentier, Albin Michel
2005: Les Rendez-vous. La psychanalyse de François Mitterrand, Maren Sell
2009: J'vais vous dire un truc... : Les plus belles déclarations de Nicolas Sarkozy, La Découverte
2011: Un sujet français, Albin Michel

External links
 Ali Magoudi on Babelio
 Ali Magoudi à la lettre
 Ali Magoudi, Un sujet français on Hommes § migrations
 Ali MAGOUDI biography on Africultures
 Ali Magoudi, dans l'inconscient de Mitterrand on Le Monde (25 November 2005)
 Ali Magoudi rend hommage à un père trop secret on L'Express (1 September 2011)
 Ali Magoudi, "Un sujet français" on YouTube

1948 births
Writers from Paris
20th-century French non-fiction writers
French psychoanalysts
Living people